The 1998–99 Slovak 1.Liga season was the sixth season of the Slovak 1. Liga, the second level of ice hockey in Slovakia. 12 teams participated in the league, and HK Spartak Dubnica won the championship.

Regular season

Qualification round

Relegation

 HK VTJ Wagon Slovakia Trebišov – HK Povazská Bystrica 2:1 (5:1, 1:5, 5:3)

External links
 Season on hockeyarchives.info

Slovak 1. Liga
Slovak 1. Liga seasons
Liga